Tikiri (1949 – 24 September 2019) was a female Sri Lankan elephant and one of the oldest Asian elephants belonging to Sri Lanka. She was one of the elephants used for the Kandy Esala Perahera and was often forced to march at the Perahera which is annually. She was believed to be the second oldest Asian elephant from Sri Lanka after Heiyantuduwa Raja. Tikiri died on 24 September 2019 aged 70 in Kegalle after confronting with illness. During her lifetime, she was used for mainly tourists trekking and for the religious festivals.

Earlier in 2019, the images of the weakened elephant posted by Save the Elephant founder Lek Chailert which featured the skeletal went viral on social media. The authorities faced criticism and backlash over the lack of compliance regarding the maintenance of the ill-fated elephant and alleged the authorities for torturing the old elephant by forcing it to march at annual Perehera festivals.

See also
 List of individual elephants

References 

1949 animal births
2019 animal deaths
Individual elephants
Individual animals in Sri Lanka
Elephants in Sri Lanka